The Hochsprung mit Musik is an annual indoor high jump meeting which takes place in February in Arnstadt, Germany.

First held in 1977, the meeting began as a competition between mainly East German athletes. Following the Re-unification of Germany in 1990, the competition became international and attracted athletes such as Olympic and World champion Charles Austin and Olympic silver medallist Alina Astafei. Both the world record holders (Javier Sotomayor and Stefka Kostadinova) have taken part in, and won, the meeting.

The Hochsprung mit Musik gets its name from the fact that music is played in the Sporthalle am Jahn-sportpark while athletes take their jump. It is used as a way of both building suspense and mirroring the steady rhythm needed by athletes to achieve a high jump.

The competition received greater exposure from the 2000s onwards as the winning athletes' jumps were of a significant height. This was exemplified by Kajsa Bergqvist's winning jump in 2006 of 2.08 metres – an indoor world record for the event and second only to Kostadinova's current world record of 2.09 m. Blanka Vlašić's win in 2010 with 2.06 m was the joint third highest indoor jump. A number of other indoor jumps by female athletes remain within the top 30 highest of all time, and jumps by male athletes frequently make the year's indoor best lists.

Past winners

Key:

See also
Internationales Hochsprung-Meeting Eberstadt
Women's high jump world record progression

References
General
Alle Arnstädter Sieger . Hochsprung mit Musik. Retrieved on 2010-02-09.
Specific

External links

Official website 

Athletics competitions in Germany
Recurring sporting events established in 1977
Annual indoor track and field meetings
High jump competitions
1977 establishments in East Germany
Sport in Thuringia